Richard Bryce Goodman is an American sound engineer. He was nominated for an Academy Award in the category Best Sound for the film The Hunt for Red October. He has worked on more than 70 films since 1974.

Selected filmography
 The Hunt for Red October (1990)

References

External links

Year of birth missing (living people)
Living people
American audio engineers